Bo Karenus (10 March 1937 – 25 October 2007) was a Swedish speed skater. He competed in the men's 1500 metres event at the 1960 Winter Olympics.

References

1937 births
2007 deaths
Swedish male speed skaters
Olympic speed skaters of Sweden
Speed skaters at the 1960 Winter Olympics
Sportspeople from Uppsala
20th-century Swedish people